Makthal Assembly constituency is a constituency of Telangana Legislative Assembly, India. It is one among 14 constituencies in Mahbubnagar district. It is part of Mahbubnagar Lok Sabha constituency.

Ram Mohan Reddy of Indian National Congress won the election in 2014.

Mandals
The Assembly Constituency presently comprises the following Mandals:

Election results

Telangana Legislative Assembly election, 2018

Telangana Legislative Assembly election, 2014 

Note: Chittem Ram Mohan Reddy joined TRS from INC.

See also
 List of constituencies of Telangana Legislative Assembly

References

Assembly constituencies of Telangana
Mahbubnagar district